Velagapudi is a neighbourhood and a part of Urban Notified Area of Amaravati.

Velagapudi may also refer to:

Velagapudi Ramakrishna Siddhartha Engineering College, an engineering college in Vijayawada, Andhra Pradesh
Velagapudi Ramakrishna, an Indian Civil Service (ICS) officer, industrialist, and philanthropist.

Surnames of Indian origin